Undertone singing is a set of singing techniques in which the vocalist makes use of vibrations of the vocal apparatus in order to produce subharmonic tones below the bass tone and extend the vocal range below the limits of the modal voice. In particular, the sound is produced via constricting the larynx in order to produce oscillations in the vocal cords and vestibular folds (or "false vocal cords") at certain frequencies of the vocal cords - corresponding to integer divisions of the frequency produced by  the vestibular folds, such as 1:2, 1:3, and 1:4 ratios. This will produce the corresponding subharmonic to that frequency. For example, in a 1:2 ratio, each second vibration of the vocal folds, the vestibular fold will complete a single vibration cycle which will result in an subharmonic produced an octave below the bass tone produced by the vocal cords. This technique is found in certain Tibetan forms of Buddhist Chant, as practised by monks of the Gyuto Order, as well as in Mongolian throat singing, where it is often used in conjunction with other vocal techniques, such as vocal fry. The technique produces a deep, growling quality.

References 

Singing techniques